KFTX (97.5 FM, "97.5 Real Country") is a radio station broadcasting a country music format. Licensed to Kingsville, Texas, United States, the station serves the Corpus Christi area. The station is currently owned by Quality Broadcasting Corporation and features programming from Westwood One.  Its studios are located southwest of Corpus Christi and the transmitter is near Robstown, Texas.

History
The station was assigned the call sign KINE-FM on April 20, 1984. On November 5, 1984, the station changed its call sign to KDUV, KWVS and on May 1, 1995, to the current KFTX.

References

External links
 
 

FTX
Kingsville, Texas